Simpson Branch may refer to:

Simpson Branch (Loutre River), a stream in Missouri
Simpson Branch (Mineral Fork), a stream in Missouri